Gülendam Sarıbal (born 1972) is a Turkeish armwrestler. She won medals on both arms in the 80 kg Senior, Master and Grand Master categories at the world and European championships.

Private life 
Gülendam Sarıbal was born in 1972. She is the mother of four children. She lives in Güngören distirct of Istanbul Province.

Sports career 
Sarıbal became interested in arm wrestlingwhile watching her husband in competition. In 2011 at age 39, she entered Güngören Yeni Akıncılar Sports Club in Istanbul, and started performing arm wrestling. Following trainings coached by Emin Kaska, she became champion at the Istanbul Provinncial Tournament. She then won the Turkish Championship in the Senior 80 kg category.  In 2018, she became Turkish champion in the 80 kg, and was admitted to the national team to participate at the European Championship in Bulgaria. She returned from Sofia, Bulgaria with a 5th place on the left arm.

International individual achievements

References 

1972 births
Living people
People from Güngören
Sportspeople from Istanbul
Female arm wrestlers
Turkish arm wrestlers
Turkish sportswomen